Vasilovtsi (also transliterated Vasilovci or Wassilowzi) is a village in northwestern Bulgaria, located in the Brusartsi Municipality of the Montana Province. It is situated on the bank of the Lom River.

References

Villages in Montana Province